Arachnotheca is a fungal genus in the family Onygenaceae. This is a monotypic genus, containing the single species Arachnotheca glomerata.

References

External links
 

Monotypic Eurotiomycetes genera
Onygenales